WRFK may refer to:

WRFK (FM), a radio station (107.1 FM) licensed to Barre, Vermont, United States
WKIK-FM, a radio station (102.9 FM) licensed to California, Maryland, United States, which used the call sign WRFK from 1994 to 1997
WRFK (defunct), a former radio station (106.5 FM) licensed to Richmond, Virginia, United States
WBTJ, a radio station in Richmond that uses WRFK's former frequency